Charles Westrow Hulse  (25 November 1860 – 4 June 1901) was an English first-class cricketer and British Army officer.

The son of Sir Edward Hulse, 5th Baronet of the Hulse baronets, he was born at the family seat at Breamore House in Breamore, Hampshire. He was educated at Radley College, before going up to Charsley's Hall, Oxford. He was commissioned as a second lieutenant in the Hampshire and Isle of Wight Artillery Militia in February 1880, serving with the militia at Fort Rowner. 

He was promoted to captain in April 1885, and in the same year he made a single appearance in first-class cricket for the Marylebone Cricket Club (MCC) against Hampshire at Southampton. Batting once in the match, he was dismissed in the MCC first innings for 22 runs by George Underdown. 

Charles Hulse was granted the honorary rank of major in September 1894 in the Hampshire and Isle of Wight Artillery Militia, with Hulse additionally holding the office of justice of the peace. He joined the Imperial Yeomanry in February 1901, where he was given the honorary rank of second lieutenant. Serving in the Second Boer War, he was killed in action in June 1901 at Braklaagte in the Orange Free State.

References

External links

1860 births
1901 deaths
Younger sons of baronets
People from New Forest District
People educated at Radley College
Alumni of Charsley's Hall, Oxford
English cricketers
Marylebone Cricket Club cricketers
English justices of the peace
Imperial Yeomanry officers
British Army personnel of the Second Boer War
British military personnel killed in the Second Boer War